Michael Grätzel (born 11 May 1944, in Dorfchemnitz, Saxony, Germany) is a professor at the École Polytechnique Fédérale de Lausanne where he directs the Laboratory of Photonics and Interfaces. He pioneered research on energy and electron transfer reactions in mesoscopic-materials and their optoelectronic applications. He co-invented with Brian O'Regan the Grätzel cell in 1988.

Graetzel is the author of over 1000 publications, two books and inventor or co-inventor of over 80 patents, he has been the Mary Upton Visiting Professor at Cornell University and a distinguished visiting professor at the National University of Singapore, and is currently a distinguished scientist at King Abdulaziz University. He was an invited professor at the University of California, Berkeley, the École normale supérieure Paris-Saclay and Delft University of Technology.

Education and career
In 1968 he graduated from Free University of Berlin, in 1971 he earned the Doctor of Philosophy in natural science at Technical University of Berlin. In 1976 he completed habilitation in physical chemistry at the Free University of Berlin. Since 1977 to the present day he is a professor at the Swiss Federal Institute of Technology   in Lausanne, where he directs the Laboratory of Photonics and Interfaces. He worked as postdoctoral research fellow, lecturer, visiting professor at the Hahn-Meitner Institute, Free University of Berlin, University of California at Berkeley, Ecole Normale Supérieure de Cachan, Oil and Gas Research Fund, University of Notre Dame and other educational and research centers. In 1991, he published his breakthrough work in Nature magazine with regard to the new type of solar cells based on a three-dimensional array of tiny (mesoscopic) oxide semiconductor particles with wide band gap covered with an organic pigment that have brought the name of professor into repute and were named as Graetzel cells.
Graetzel is the holder of 10 honorary doctorates in Universities of Asia and Europe: Denmark, Holland, China, Sweden, Singapore and other countries. He is the laureate of tens of prestigious scientific and engineering prizes, such as Grand Prix “Millennium Technology”, Medal of Faraday granted by British Royal Society, Gutenberg Prize, Albert Einstein Prize and others.

Graetzel is a member of the Swiss Chemical Society, the Max Planck Society, and the German Academy of Science (Leopoldina), as well as an honorable member of the Israeli Chemical Society and the Bulgarian Academy of Science, an honorary fellow of the Royal Society of Chemistry, and a Fellow of the US-National Academy of Inventors.

Scientific achievements
Graetzel is one of developers of the so-called Graetzel cell operating on the principles of photosynthesis– the process similar to biochemical one and used by plants for light

Recognition
Graetzel's work has been cited over 250,000 times, his h-index is 224, making him one of the 10 most highly cited chemists in the world.   He was a frequent guest scientist at the National Renewable Energy Laboratory (NREL) in Golden, Colorado, was a fellow of the Japanese Society for the Promotion of Science. In 2009 he was named Distinguished Honorary Professor by the Chinese Academy of Science (Changchun) and the Huazhong University of Science and Technology.

Graetzel has received numerous awards including the Millennium 2000 European innovation prize, the 2001 Faraday Medal of the British Royal Society, the 2001 Dutch Havinga Award, the 2004 Italgas Prize, two McKinsey Venture awards in 1998 and 2002 and the 2005 Gerischer Prize. In 2007 he was awarded the Harvey Prize of Technion for pioneered research on energy and electron transfer reactions in mesoscopic-materials and their optoelectronic applications. In 2009 he was awarded the Balzan Prize for the Science of New Materials. On 9 June 2010, Grätzel received the Millennium Technology Prize, for development of dye-sensitized solar cells. The cash prize, worth 800,000 euros, was awarded, in Helsinki, Finland, by the president of Finland, Tarja Halonen. His most recent awards include: 2011 Gutenberg Research Award; 2011 Paul Karrer Gold Medal; 2011 Wilhelm Exner Medal; 2012 Albert Einstein World Award of Science; and the 2013 Marcel Benoist Prize. In 2015 he received the King Faisal International Prize in Chemistry and in 2017 the Global Energy Prize "for transcendent merits in development of low cost and efficient solar cells, known as “Graetzel cells”, aimed to creation of cost-efficient, large-scale engineering solutions for power generation." In 2020 he received the BBVA Foundation Frontiers of Knowledge Award.

Graetzel holds honorary doctorates from Faculty of Science and Technology at Uppsala University, Sweden (1996), Turin and Nova Gorica. He was elected honorary member of the Société Vaudoise des Sciences Naturelles. Grätzel is a member of the scientific advisory committee at the IMDEA Nanoscience Institute.

Interesting facts
Graetzel cell-based batteries are more convenient for consumer compared to silicon-based photocells – they could be made flexible and in various colors. It is convenient for use and power generation, for instance, in various structural elements of buildings. It is possible to create structurally transparent cells able to generate electric power within various bands of light frequencies, up to infrared one. It means that, in particular, they could be embedded into window glasses resulting in double effect for premises cooling and associated electric power generation.
Several companies have already launched mass production of photocells based upon renewed Graetzel cells. Graetzel is the author of more than 1300 publications, two monographs; he holds more than 50 patents. He is one of the three globally most cited chemistry academicians.

See also

 Grätzel cell (Dye-sensitized solar cell)
 Photoelectrochemical cell
 Perovskite solar cell

Notes and references 

1944 births
Albert Einstein World Award of Science Laureates
Living people
20th-century German chemists
21st-century Swiss chemists
Dye-sensitized solar cells
Academic staff of the École Polytechnique Fédérale de Lausanne
Members of the German Academy of Sciences Leopoldina
Foreign members of the Chinese Academy of Sciences
People associated with renewable energy
Free University of Berlin alumni
Technical University of Berlin alumni
People from Saxony